Choanomphalus amauronius is a species of freshwater air-breathing snail, an aquatic pulmonate gastropod mollusk in the family Planorbidae, the ram's horn snails, or planorbids.

Subspecies 
 Choanomphalus amauronius amauronius Bourguignat, 1860
 Choanomphalus amauronius angulatus (B. Dybowski & Grochmalicki, 1925)
 Choanomphalus amauronius westerlundianus Lindholm, 1909 The subspecific name westerlundianus is in honor of Swedish malacologist Carl Agardh Westerlund.

Distribution 
This species is found in Lake Baikal, Russia and in Angara River.

Description
The width of the shell is 5–6 mm. The height of the shell is 4 mm.

References

External links

Planorbidae
Gastropods described in 1860